The Greek Plan or Greek Project was an early solution to the Eastern Question which was advanced by Catherine the Great in the early 1780s. It envisaged the partition of the Ottoman Empire between the Russian and Habsburg Empires followed by the restoration of the Eastern Roman Empire centered in Constantinople.

Outline 

Like her predecessors, Catherine concerned herself with the Orthodox Christians under Ottoman rule; she sponsored the Orlov Revolt in the Morea during the Russo-Turkish War of 1768–1774, and invited many Greeks like Ioannis Varvakis to settle in Russia, mainly in Crimea and New Russia. She conceived that one of her grandsons, appropriately named Constantine, would become the first emperor of the restored Byzantium. Another important consideration was Russia's goal of free access to the Mediterranean Sea through the Bosphorus, which the Ottomans controlled. 	

For this plan to succeed, the Great European Powers would need to agree to it and the Danube powers to cooperate. In May 1780, Catherine arranged a secret meeting with Joseph II, the Holy Roman Emperor, in Mogilyov. In a series of letters from September 1781, Catherine and Joseph discussed their plans to partition  the Ottoman Empire and restore the Byzantine Empire. The Austro-Russian alliance was formalized in May 1781.

The Greek Plan was masterminded by Prince Potemkin who gave Greek names to the newly founded towns in New Russia (e.g., Odessa and Kherson). Byzantine symbolism was highlighted in new churches such as Kherson Cathedral. Another meeting of the Russian and Austrian monarchs was arranged as part of Catherine's Crimean journey of 1787. Both countries declared war on the Ottoman Empire later that year. Joseph's death in 1790, followed by the Treaty of Jassy and the Treaty of Sistova, in which Austria gained little, effectively ended the agreement. Austrian and European interests also had moved westward with the beginning of the French Revolution in 1789 which would occupy European affairs and alliances until the eventual fall of Napoleon in 1815. The new Concert of Europe was more concerned with maintaining the territorial integrity of the nations that occupied the Balkan peninsula.

Cities named after Greek names during this period

The following major cities were given Greek inspired names during this period. Some of them were new settlements, others were renamed.

See also
 Megali Idea

References

Sources 
 Catherine's Russia: Catherine the Great's "Greek Project"
 Foundation of the Hellenic World: The Greek plan of Catherine II

1780s in the Ottoman Empire
1780s in the Russian Empire
Greece–Russia relations
Ottoman Empire–Russian Empire relations
Legacy of the Roman Empire